"Hopelessly Yours" is a song written by Keith Whitley, Curly Putman, and Don Cook. Whitley recorded a demo that was never officially released.  The first release was by George Jones on his 1986 album Wine Colored Roses.

The song is more well known from a version American country music artist John Conlee released on his 1989 album, Fellow Travelers.  It was released as the album's third single in 1989 and peaked at number 67 on the Billboard Hot Country Singles chart. Before its release, Conlee included it as the B-side to his 1989 single "Hit the Ground Runnin'", which peaked at number 43.

The song was covered as a duet by American country music artists Lee Greenwood and Suzy Bogguss in 1991, and released as the first single from Greenwood's album  A Perfect 10. In 1992, it was nominated for Best Country Vocal Collaboration at the Grammy Awards. It reached number 12 on the Billboard Hot Country Singles & Tracks chart. This version was released only as an airplay single, and did not feature a B-side.

Chart performance

John Conlee

Lee Greenwood and Suzy Bogguss

Year-end charts

References

1989 singles
1991 singles
George Jones songs
John Conlee songs
Lee Greenwood songs
Suzy Bogguss songs
Songs written by Don Cook
Songs written by Curly Putman
Capitol Records Nashville singles
Song recordings produced by Jerry Crutchfield
1986 songs